Elchanan Mossel is a professor of mathematics at the Massachusetts Institute of Technology. His primary research fields are probability theory, combinatorics, and statistical inference.

Research
Mossel's research spans a number of topics across mathematics, statistics, economics, and computer science, including combinatorial statistics, discrete function inequalities, isoperimetry, game theory, social choice, computational complexity, and computational evolutionary biology.

His work on discrete Fourier analysis and functions with low influence includes important contributions such as the proof of the "Majority is Stablest" conjecture, together with Ryan O'Donnell and Krzysztof Oleszkiewicz, and the proof of the optimality of the Goemans–Williamson MAX-CUT algorithm, with Subhash Khot, Guy Kindler and Ryan O’Donnell.

Mossel has worked on the reconstruction problem on trees. 
He connected it to Steel's conjecture in Phylogenetic reconstruction, partially in work with Constantinos Daskalakis and Sébastien Roch. 
 
 
These result links the extremality of the Ising model on the Bethe lattice to a phase transition in the amount of data required for statistical inference on phylogenetic trees.

With Joe Neeman and Allan Sly he established the role of the reconstruction problem on trees for the problem of detection in block models.

Education and career
Mossel graduated from the Open University of Israel in 1992 with a B.Sc. in mathematics. In 2000, he received his Ph.D. in mathematics from the Hebrew University. Mossel held a postdoctoral position at Microsoft Research and was a Miller Research Fellow at UC Berkeley before becoming a Professor at UC Berkeley, the Weizmann Institute, the University of Pennsylvania and finally MIT.

Mossel is a prolific scholar, with more than 100 coauthors and over 150 papers listed in MathSciNet as of 2022. He has advised 10 graduate students who have subsequently held faculty positions at UCLA, Princeton, UC Berkeley, Caltech, the University of Wisconsin, the University of Texas, the Chinese University of Hong Kong and the University of Minnesota.

Recognition
 2005 Sloan Fellow in Computer Science.
 2019 Simons Investigator Award in Mathematics. 
 2019 Class of fellows of the American Mathematical Society "for contributions to probability, combinatorics, computing, and especially the interface between them".
 2020 Vannevar Bush Faculty Fellowship of the U.S. Department of Defense.
 2021 Fellow of the Association for Computing Machinery "for contributions to theoretical computer science and inference".
 2022 Special Sectional Lecture at International Congress of Mathematics 2022 titled "Combinatorial Statistics and the Sciences" (in sections 12 = probability, 13 = combinatorics, 14 = mathematics of computer science and 18 = stochastic and differential modeling).

References

12

External links 
Elchanan Mossel's Home Page

Living people
20th-century American mathematicians
21st-century American mathematicians
Probability theorists
Fellows of the American Mathematical Society
Year of birth missing (living people)
People from Jerusalem
Massachusetts Institute of Technology School of Science faculty